Dundalk entered the 2015 season as the reigning League Champions from 2014, having won the title for the first time since 1995, and were also the League Cup holders. 2015 was Stephen Kenny's third season at the club as manager. It was Dundalk's seventh consecutive season in the top tier of Irish football, their 80th in all, and their 89th in the League of Ireland.

Season summary
The new season's curtain raiser - the President's Cup - was played on 28 February in Oriel Park between Dundalk and St Patrick's Athletic - the winners of the FAI Cup the previous year. Dundalk won on a 2-1 scoreline - their first success in the competition. The 33 round League programme commenced on 6 March 2015, and was completed on 30 October 2015. Dundalk retained the title for the first time in their history, sealing it with three games to spare. They subsequently won the 2015 FAI Cup Final with a 1-0 victory over Cork City after extra time. An opportunity to win the club's first domestic Treble was passed up when a largely reserve side lost the League Cup semi-final in a penalty shoot-out. However they also won the Leinster Senior Cup, defeating Shamrock Rovers 3-1 in the final. The trophy haul for the year made the 2015 season the most successful in their history.

In Europe they were knocked out at the first hurdle, losing to BATE Borisov in the Champions League second qualifying round when, after scoring an away goal in a 2-1 defeat, they were unable to score the goal in Oriel Park that would have sent them through to the next round.

First-Team Squad (2015)
Sources:

Competitions

President's Cup
Source:

Premier Division

FAI Cup
Source:
Second Round

Third Round

Quarter Final

Semi Final

Final

League Cup
Source:
Second Round

Quarter Final

Semi Final

Leinster Senior Cup
Source:
Fourth Round

Quarter Final

Semi Final

Final

Europe

Champions League
Source:
Second qualifying round

BATE Borisov won 2–1 on aggregate.

Awards

Player of the Month

PFAI Player of the Year

FAI League of Ireland Player of the Year

SWAI Personality of the Year

RTÉ Sports Team of the Year

Footnotes

References

Dundalk F.C. seasons
Dundalk